Spindal and similar may refer to:

Kahdal Spindal, character in Biomega (manga)
 Spindale, North Carolina, U.S.
 Spindel, a surname
 Spindle (disambiguation)